Katturumbu (Malayalam: കട്ടുറുമ്പ്) is a Malayalam children television show, broadcast on Flowers TV. The show features children from four to nine years. The children showcase various dubsmash, skits, dance performances and many other talents. The show was initially hosted by actress and VJ Pearle Maaney. Later, it was hosted by Swasika.

Cast
Swasika - Talk Show Host
Pearle Maaney - Talk Show Host
Shweta Menon
Sibi Malayil (Guest Cast)
Miya (actress) (Guest Cast)
 Marina Michael (Guest Cast)
Rishi S Kumar (Guest Cast)
 Megha Matthews (Guest Cast)
 Shanavas (Guest Cast)

References

Malayalam-language television shows
2010s Indian television series
Flowers (TV channel) original programming